Belšak ( or ) is a small dispersed settlement in the Municipality of Prevalje in the Carinthia region in northern Slovenia, right on the border with Austria.

References

External links
Belšak on Geopedia

Populated places in the Municipality of Prevalje